Pat Fitzsimons (born December 15, 1950) is an American professional golfer who has played on the PGA Tour and the Nike Tour.

Fitzsimons was born in Coos Bay, Oregon. He attended the University of Oregon. He turned professional in 1971.

Fitzsimons had eleven top-10 finishes in official PGA Tour events including a win at the 1975 Glen Campbell-Los Angeles Open. His career year was 1975 when he received Golf Digest'''s Most Improved Golfer'' award and was named Oregon's pro athlete of the year. His best finish in a major championship was T-9 at the 1975 U.S. Open. He lived in Prineville, Oregon during much of his regular career.

Fitzsimons played some on the Nike Tour during his late forties to prepare for the Champions Tour. His best finish in a Nike Tour event was a T-5 at the 1995 NIKE Tri-Cities Open. After reaching the age of 50 in December 2000, he began play on the Champions Tour but with very limited success.

Fitzsimons works with Bobby Walzel and Bunky Henry at GolfQuest, a Houston-based company which organizes corporate golf retreats. He also works as a teaching pro at The Palms Golf Club in La Quinta, California. He lives in the greater San Diego area and has two sons.

Professional wins (11)

PGA Tour wins (1)

Other wins (10)
1968 Oregon Open (as an amateur)
1969 Northwest Open (as an amateur)
1976 Pacific Northwest PGA Championship
1977 Northwest Open
1981 Northwest Open
1983 Pacific Northwest PGA Championship, Al C. Giusti Memorial Tournament
1985 Pacific Northwest PGA Championship
1995 Al C. Giusti Memorial Tournament
1990 Oregon Open

See also 

 1972 PGA Tour Qualifying School graduates
1989 PGA Tour Qualifying School graduates

References

External links

American male golfers
PGA Tour golfers
Golfers from Oregon
Golfers from California
People from Coos Bay, Oregon
People from Prineville, Oregon
1950 births
Living people